Diaphania immaculalis is a moth in the family Crambidae. It was described by Achille Guenée in 1854 and is found in Guadeloupe.

References

Diaphania
Endemic fauna of Guadeloupe
Moths described in 1854
Moths of Guadeloupe
Taxa named by Achille Guenée